A member of the tenascin family, tenascin X (TN-X) also known as flexillin or hexabrachion-like protein is a 450kDa glycoprotein that is expressed in connective tissues. TN-X possesses a modular structure composed, from the N- to the C-terminal part by a Tenascin assembly domain (TAD), a series of 18.5 repeats of epidermal growth factor (EGF)-like motif, a high number of Fibronectin type III (FNIII) module, and a fibrinogen (FBG)-like globular domain. In humans, tenascin X is encoded by the TNXB gene.

Gene 

This gene localizes to the major histocompatibility complex (MHC class III) region on chromosome 6. The structure of this gene is unusual in that it overlaps the CREBL1 and CYP21A2 genes at its 5' and 3' ends, respectively. TNXB also possesses a pseudogene, TNXA, which is a consequence of MHC classe III locus duplication during evolution. Strong 3' homology between TNXB and TNXA can provoke genetic recombination between the two loci, thus leading to the apparition of TNXA/TNXB chimera.

Function 

TN-X is constitutively expressed in adult tissues such as skin, ligaments, tendons, lungs, kidneys, optic nerves, mammary and adrenal glands, blood vessels, testis, and ovaries. It is also found in different compartments of the digestive tract, including pancreas, stomach, jejunum, ileum, and colon. In this wide variety of organs, TN-X is mainly located within the connective tissue such as peritendineum (external structural component of tendons), epimysium and perimysium (muscle components), renal glomeruli, blood vessels and skin dermis. TN-X has been proposed to have an important structural and architectural function, especially within the skin. In fact, in vitro experiments demonstrate that TN-X physically interacts with fibrillar collagens type I, III and V, as well as FACIT (Fibrillar Associated Collagen with Interruption of the Triple helix) including type XII and XIV collagens. It also interacts with Transforming Growth Factor (TGF)-β which is a pro-fibrotic cytokine and Decorin, a small 100 kDa dermatan sulfate proteoglycan that plays a crucial role in collagen fibrillogenesis. In vivo, transmission electron microscopy coupled with immuno-labelling confirms the very close location of TN-X with collagen fibbers in dermis, tendons and kidney glomeruli.

In addition to this architectural function, TN-X also demonstrated counter-adhesive properties, at least for human osteosarcoma cells (MG-63), murine embryonic fibroblasts (MRC-5) as well as human endothelial cells (ECV-304).

Clinical significance 

Homozygous mutations, heterozygous compound (bi-allelic) mutations or haploinsufficiency in TN-X cause classical-like Ehlers-Danlos syndrome (EDS), a rare and hereditary connective tissue disorder in mice and human. This pathology is characterized by skin hyperlaxity, joint hypermobility and global tissue weakness as a consequence of elastin fragmentation and reduced collagen density, especially in skin.

References

Further reading

External links 
  GeneReviews/NCBI/NIH/UW entry on Ehlers-Danlos Syndrome, Hypermobility Type

Tenascins